Oswaldo Moreno Heredia (1929 – 3 December 2011) was an Ecuadorian painter. His paintings are in collections in the Americas, Europe, Asia and the Middle East, including El Museo De Arte Moderno del Banco Central, El Museo De La Casa De Cultura, and in the Alianza Francesa Galleries. Moreno was featured in "El Grupo Van - 30 Anos Despues" with eight other Ecuadorian painters. Moreno created around ten thousand works of art located around the world. He died at the age of 82 in Quito, Ecuador of diabetes.

References

20th-century Ecuadorian painters
1929 births
2011 deaths
21st-century Ecuadorian painters
Deaths from diabetes